Reningavaram is a village in the district of Prakasam in the state of Andhra Pradesh, India.

References

Villages in Prakasam district